Kittikun Sriutthawong (born 3 August 1986) is a former member of the Thailand men's national volleyball team. He is currently manager of the club Diamond Food Volleyball Club.

Career
Kittikun played on loan with the club Air Force for the 2017 season.
Kittikun is currently the coach of Thailand women's national volleyball team (2021 Nations League squad). He is currently manager of the club Diamond Food Volleyball Club.

Education
He got a bachelor's degree from Phra Nakorn Rajabhat University and a master's degree from Sripatum University.

Clubs 
  Phitsanulok (2005–2007)
  Phetchabun (2007–2009)
  Chakungrao - Armed Forces (2009–2010)
  Chonburi (2011–2015)
  Phitsanulok (2015–2016)
  NK Fitness Samutsakhon (2016–2018)
  Air Force (2017)
  Diamond Food Saraburi (2018–2021)

Awards

Individual
 2006 Thailand League "Best Scorer"
 2014–15 Thailand League "Best Outside Hitters"
 2015–16 Thailand League "Most Valuable Player"
 2014 Thai-Denmark Super League "Most Valuable Player"
 2015 Thai-Denmark Super League "Most Valuable Player"

Clubs 
 2008–09 Thailand League -  Champion, with Phetchabun
 2009–10 Thailand League -  Champion, with Chakungrao - Armed Forces
 2010–11 Thailand League -  Champion, with Chonburi
 2011–12 Thailand League -  Champion, with Chonburi
 2012–13 Thailand League -  Bronze medal, with Chonburi
 2013–14 Thailand League -  Runner-up, with Chonburi
 2014–15 Thailand League -  Runner-up, with Chonburi
 2014 Thai-Denmark Super League -  Champion, with Chonburi
 2015 Thai-Denmark Super League -  Champion, with Chonburi
 2015–16 Thailand League -  Champion, with Wing 46 Phitsanulok
 2017 Thai–Denmark Super League -  Bronze medal, with NK Fitness Samutsakhon
 2018 Thai–Denmark Super League -  Runner-Up, with Visakha
 2018–19 Thailand League -  Runner-Up, with Saraburi
 2019 Thai–Denmark Super League -  Third, with Saraburi

Royal decorations
 2015 -  Gold Medalist (Sixth Class) of The Most Admirable Order of the Direkgunabhorn
 2013 -  Commander (Third Class) of The Most Exalted Order of the White Elephant

References

1986 births
Living people
Kittikun Sriutthawong
Kittikun Sriutthawong
Volleyball players at the 2006 Asian Games
Volleyball players at the 2010 Asian Games
Volleyball players at the 2014 Asian Games
Volleyball players at the 2018 Asian Games
Kittikun Sriutthawong
Kittikun Sriutthawong
Kittikun Sriutthawong
Southeast Asian Games medalists in volleyball
Competitors at the 2007 Southeast Asian Games
Competitors at the 2009 Southeast Asian Games
Competitors at the 2011 Southeast Asian Games
Competitors at the 2013 Southeast Asian Games
Competitors at the 2015 Southeast Asian Games
Competitors at the 2017 Southeast Asian Games
Kittikun Sriutthawong